The Yakovlev Yak-32 (NATO reporting name Mantis) was a single-seat version of the Yakovlev Yak-30 (1960), and was claimed by the OKB to be the world's first sporting aircraft with an ejection seat. This version was designated Yak-104PS. Neither the Yak-30 nor the Yak-32 entered production.

Design and development
Developed concurrently with the Yak-30, the Yak-32 was a single-seat aircraft designed as both a sporting jet, and a light military ground attack aircraft.
The airframe of the Yak-32 was that of the Yak-30, but modified to include only a single seat. Yakovlev had intended to market the aircraft as a sporting jet at a time when no other single-seat jet aircraft were being marketed for civilian use. In fact, it would not be until the introduction of the jet version of the Bede BD-5 in the 1970s that another sport aircraft like the Yak-32 was offered. Even in the 21st century, single-seat sporting jets are rarely offered by manufacturers.

The light attack version of the Yak-32 was designated Yak-32Sh, and was planned to include more sophisticated avionics than the Yak-32. It could also carry external fuel and weapons loads, including a ZB-500 or ZB-360 external fuel tank, bombs of up to 500 kg, up to four rocket launchers (the largest being the UB-32/S-5), up to four K-13/R-3S missiles, four ARS-240 rockets, or four AOI-9 or UKP-23 gun pods, each with 250 rounds.

On 5 August 1971, one of the Yak-32s was ordered to be equipped with RU19P-300 which has been modified to permit longer inverted flight. The aircraft received the designation Yak-32P. Flight evaluation of the aircraft was just as good as the original Yak-32.

Operational history
Three Yak-32 prototypes were built in 1960-1961 at the same time as the four prototype Yak-30s trainers. They had callsigns 32, 60 and 70. The aircraft 30 and 70 gave aerobatic demonstrations at the 1961 Aviation Day at Tushino. They went on to set several world class records (their thrust being misreported to the FAI as 800 kg).

The ASCC allocated the name "Mantis" to the Yak-32/Yak-104.

Survivors
 One Yak-32 was preserved by Yakovlev and is on display at Khodinka, displayed in the OKB's house colors of red and white.

Specifications (Yak-32 No.1)

See also

References

Notes

Bibliography

 Jakubovich, Nikolay. Wings of Motherland: Aviation and politics, or how 'Dolphin' destroyed Yak-30.

External links

Aero-concept.com
Ctrl-c.liu.se
Airwar.ru (RU)
Yak-30 Walkaround

1960s Soviet military trainer aircraft
Yak-032 1960
Abandoned military aircraft projects of the Soviet Union
Single-engined jet aircraft
Aircraft first flown in 1960